"Weak Become Heroes" is a song by English rapper and producer Mike Skinner under the music project the Streets. It was released in July 2002 as the third single from their debut studio album, Original Pirate Material.

Background
The song concerns Skinner's experiences of rave culture in the mid-1990s. He says:

Skinner also makes reference to the Criminal Justice and Public Order Act 1994, an act which was seen as curtailing the rights of people to host raves.

Music video
The video was filmed in the Works Nightclub (later Hippodrome) in Kingston upon Thames, London, with some external shots outside the club in St James's Road in 2002. The club closed in July 2018 and was demolished to make way for luxury apartments.

Track listings

CD 1
 "Weak Become Heroes" (Ashley Beedle's Love Bug Vocal)
 "Same Old Thing" (Outlaw Breaks Remix)
 "Same Old Thing" (Morph Resurrection Remix)

Double A-side
 "It's Too Late" (Album version)
 "Weak Become Heroes" (Single edit)
 "Weak Become Heroes" (Ashley Beedle's Love Bug Vocal)
 "Weak Become Heroes" (Röyksopp's Memory Lane Mix)
 "Let's Push Things Forward" (The Streets Remix featuring Roll Deep)

Remixes EP
 "Weak Become Heroes" (3 Fans Vocal Rerub, by DJ Swingsett, Takuya Nakamura & Lisa Shaw)
 "Weak Become Heroes" (3 Fans Dub Rerub, by DJ Swingsett, Takuya Nakamura & Lisa Shaw)
 "Weak Become Heroes" (Röyksopp's Memory Lane Mix)
 "Weak Become Heroes"

Charts

References

External links
 

2002 songs
2002 singles
The Streets songs
679 Artists singles